NY-2 may refer to:

 Consolidated NY-2, an aircraft
 New York's 2nd congressional district
 New York State Route 2

See also 
 New York State Route 2 (disambiguation)